The Chiwawa River is a tributary of the Wenatchee River, in the U.S. state of Washington. It is completely contained within Chelan County.

Much of the Chiwawa River's drainage basin is designated national forest and wilderness. The upper Chiwawa watershed is in nearly pristine condition.

The river is part of the Columbia River basin, being a tributary of the Wenatchee River, which is tributary to the Columbia River.

The river's name comes from a Columbia-Moses term meaning of kind of creek ("wawa" creek). A large number of place names in the Chiwawa River basin were given by Albert H. Sylvester.

Course
The Chiwawa River originates in the Glacier Peak Wilderness of the North Cascades, on the southern slopes of Chiwawa Mountain and Fortress Mountain. It flows south through the Wenatchee National Forest, between Chiwawa Ridge to the west and the Entiat Mountains to the east.

The Chiwawa River empties into the Wenatchee River several miles east of Lake Wenatchee.

See also
 List of rivers in Washington
 Tributaries of the Columbia River

References

Rivers of Washington (state)
Rivers of Chelan County, Washington